Dar Chenar (also Romanized as Dar Chenār) is a village in Javar Rural District, in the Central District of Kuhbanan County, Kerman Province, Iran. At the 2006 census, its population was 16, in 4 families.

References 

Populated places in Kuhbanan County